The 2015 Miami Hurricanes baseball team will represent the University of Miami during the 2015 NCAA Division I baseball season. The Hurricanes will play their home games at Mark Light Field at Alex Rodriguez Park as a member of the Atlantic Coast Conference. They will be led by head coach Jim Morris, in his 22nd season at Miami.

Previous season
In 2014, the Hurricanes finished the season as champions of the ACC's Coastal Division with a record of 44–19, 24–6 in conference play. They qualified for the 2014 Atlantic Coast Conference baseball tournament, and were eliminated in pool play. They qualified for the 2014 NCAA Division I baseball tournament, and were hosts of the Coral Gables regional which included Texas Tech, Columbia, and Bethune-Cookman. The Hurricanes shut out Bethune-Cookman, 1–0, in the opening game, but then fell 3–0 to Texas Tech to move into the loser's bracket. There, the Hurricanes again defeated the Wildcats, this time by a score of 10–0. In the first game of the regional final against the Red Raiders, Miami won 2–1 in 10 innings. However, in the second game, Texas Tech won 4–0 and advanced to the Lubbock Super Regional, and subsequently the College World Series.

Personnel

Roster

Coaching staff

Schedule

! style=""|Regular Season
|- valign="top" 

|- bgcolor="ccffcc"
| February 13 ||  || #14 || Alex Rodriguez Park • Coral Gables, FL || W 5–2 || Hammond (1–0) || Herrmann (0–1) || D. Garcia (1) || 2,628 || 1–0 ||
|- bgcolor="ccffcc"
| February 14 || Rutgers || #14 || Alex Rodriguez Park • Coral Gables, FL || W 9–5 || Woodrey (1–0) || McCoy (0–1) || Otero (1) || 2,620 || 2–0 ||
|- bgcolor="ccffcc"
| February 14 || Rutgers || #14 || Alex Rodriguez Park • Coral Gables, FL || W 9–3 || Sosa (1–0) || Driscoll (0–1) || Hammond (1) || 2,860 || 3–0 ||
|- bgcolor="ccffcc"
| February 15 || Rutgers || #14 || Alex Rodriguez Park • Coral Gables, FL || W 25–4 || Beauprez (1–0) || Rosa (0–1) || None || 2,577 || 4–0 ||
|- bgcolor="ffbbb"
| February 18 || at  || #14 || FAU Baseball Stadium • Boca Raton, FL || L 3–5 || Logan (1–0) || Hammond (1–1) || None || 1,097 || 4–1 ||
|- bgcolor="ffbbb"
| February 20 || at #5 Florida || #14 || Alfred A. McKethan Stadium • Gainesville, FL || L 3–4 || Lewis (1–0) || Mediavilla (0–1) || None || 3,661 || 4–2 ||
|- bgcolor="ccffcc"
| February 21 || at #5 Florida || #14 || Alfred A. McKethan Stadium • Gainesville, FL || W 7–2 || Woodrey (2–0) || Puk (1–1) || None || 6,081 || 5–2 ||
|- bgcolor="ffbbb"
| February 22 || at #5 Florida || #14 || Alfred A. McKethan Stadium • Gainesville, FL || L 1–2 || Dunning (2–0) || Sosa (1–0) || Lewis (1) || 4,734 || 5–3 ||
|- bgcolor="ccffcc"
| February 25 || Barry || #23 || Alex Rodriguez Park • Coral Gables, FL || W 5–3 || D. Garcia (1–0) || Hernandez (1–2) || B. Garcia (1) || 2,181 || 6–3 ||
|- bgcolor="ccffcc"
| February 27 ||  || #23 || Alex Rodriguez Park • Coral Gables, FL || W 8–7 || Hammond (2–1) || Elliott (0–1) || None || 2,389 || 7–3 ||
|- bgcolor="ccffcc"
| February 28 || Wright State || #23 || Alex Rodriguez Park • Coral Gables, FL || W 4–3 || B. Garcia (1–0) || Elliott (0–2) || None || 2,418 || 8–3 ||
|-

|- bgcolor="ffbbb"
| March 1 || Wright State || #23 || Alex Rodriguez Park • Coral Gables, FL || L 6–12 || Randolph (1–0) || Beauprez (1–1) || None || 2,377 || 8–4 ||
|- bgcolor="ccffcc"
| March 4 ||  || #23 || Alex Rodriguez Park • Coral Gables, FL || W 7–3 || D. Garcia (2–0) || Koerner (2–2) || B. Garcia (3) || 1,953 || 9–4 ||
|- bgcolor="ffbbb"
| March 6 || at #24 Louisville || #23 || Jim Patterson Stadium • Louisville, KY || L 6–9 || Baird (1–0) || Woodrey (2–1) || Harrington (2) || 1,452 || 9–5 || 0–1
|- bgcolor="ccffcc"
| March 7 || at #24 Louisville || #23 || Jim Patterson Stadium • Louisville, KY || W 9–5 || Sosa (2–1) || Kidston (0–2) || B. Garcia (4) || 1,452 || 10–5 || 1–1
|- bgcolor="ffbbb"
| March 8 || at #24 Louisville || #23 || Jim Patterson Stadium • Louisville, KY || L 4–5 || McKay (2–0) || B. Garcia (1–1) || None || 1,492 || 10–6 || 1–2
|- bgcolor="ccffcc"
| March 10 || at Florida Gulf Coast || #25 || Swanson Stadium • Fort Myers, FL || W 15–4 || Briggi (1–0) || Anderson (2–1) || None || 1,243 || 11–6 ||
|- bgcolor="ccffcc"
| March 11 ||  || #25 || Alex Rodriguez Park • Coral Gables, FL || W 7–0 || D. Garcia (3–0) || Lynch (0–2) || None || 2,143 || 12–6 ||
|- bgcolor="ccffcc"
| March 13 || NC State || #25 || Alex Rodriguez Park • Coral Gables, FL || W 3–210 || B. Garcia (2–1) || DeJuneas (1–1) || None || 2,420 || 13–6 || 2–2
|- bgcolor="ccffcc"
| March 14 || NC State || #25 || Alex Rodriguez Park • Coral Gables, FL || W 9–2 || Sosa (3–1) || Brown (2–1) || None || 2,836 || 14–6 || 3–2
|- bgcolor="ccffcc"
| March 15 || NC State || #25 || Alex Rodriguez Park • Coral Gables, FL || W 6–0 || Suarez (1–0) || Piedmonte (2–1) || None || 2,502 || 15–6 || 4–2
|- bgcolor="ccffcc"
| March 17 ||  || #20 || Alex Rodriguez Park • Coral Gables, FL || W 9–1 || D. Garcia (4–0) || Gardner (2–1) || None || 2,101 || 16–6 || 
|- bgcolor="ccffcc"
| March 20 || at Wake Forest || #20 || Wake Forest Baseball Park • Winston-Salem, NC || W 15–2 || Woodrey (3–1) || Pirro (5–1) || None || 588 || 17–6 || 5–2
|- bgcolor="ccffcc"
| March 21 || at Wake Forest || #20 || Wake Forest Baseball Park • Winston-Salem, NC || W 12–7 || Suarez (2–0) || Craig (0–1) || None || 901 || 18–6 || 6–2
|- bgcolor="ffbbb"
| March 22 || at Wake Forest || #20 || Wake Forest Baseball Park • Winston-Salem, NC || L 4–10 || Dunshee (4–0) || Sosa (3–2) || None || 634 || 18–7 || 6–3
|- bgcolor="ffbbb"
| March 25 || Florida Gulf Coast || #18 || Alex Rodriguez Park • Coral Gables, FL || L 1–8 || Desguin (3–0) || D. Garcia (4–1) || None || 2,328 || 18–8 ||
|- bgcolor="ccffcc"
| March 27 || at #27  || #18 || Boshamer Stadium • Chapel Hill, NC || W 4–3 || Hammond (3–1) || Thornton (1–2) || B. Garcia (5) || 1,817 || 19–8 || 7–3
|- bgcolor="ccffcc"
| March 28 || at #27 North Carolina || #18 || Boshamer Stadium • Chapel Hill, NC || W 4–311 || B. Garcia (3–1) || Trayner (1–3) || Hammond (2) || 2,107 || 20–8 || 8–3
|- bgcolor="ffbbb"
| March 29 || at #27 North Carolina || #18 || Boshamer Stadium • Chapel Hill, NC || L 3–10 || Moss (4–0) || Sosa (3–3) || None || 2,128 || 20–9 || 8–4
|-

|- bgcolor="ccffcc"
| April 1 || Bethune-Cookman || #16 || Alex Rodriguez Park • Coral Gables, FL || W 13–3 || D. Garcia (5–1) || Lindsay (0–4) || None || 1,950 || 21–9 ||
|- bgcolor="ccffcc"
| April 3 || Duke || #16 ||Alex Rodriguez Park • Coral Gables, FL || W 4–3 || Mediavilla (1–0) || Stallings (3–4) || B. Garcia (6) || 2,509 || 22–9 || 9–4
|- bgcolor="ccffcc"
| April 4 || Duke || #16 || Alex Rodriguez Park • Coral Gables, FL || W 3–2 || Suarez (3–0) || Istler (2–2) || B. Garcia (7) || 2,916 || 23–9 || 10–4
|- bgcolor="ccffcc"
| April 5 || Duke || #16 || Alex Rodriguez Park • Coral Gables, FL || W 10–0 || Sosa (4–3) || Clark (2–2) || None || 2,291 || 24–9 || 11–4
|- bgcolor="ccffcc"
| April 8 || Florida Atlantic || #11 || Alex Rodriguez Park • Coral Gables, FL || W 4–310 || B. Garcia (4–1) || Carr (0–2) || None || 2,055 || 25–9 ||
|- bgcolor="ccffcc"
| April 10 || Virginia Tech || #11 || Alex Rodriguez Park • Coral Gables, FL || W 11–1 || Woodrey (4–1) || Keselica (4–2) || None || 2,966 || 26–9 || 12–4
|- bgcolor="ccffcc"
| April 11 || Virginia Tech || #11 || Alex Rodriguez Park • Coral Gables, FL || W 14–4 || Suarez (4–0) || Woodcock (2–2) || None || 2,930 || 27–9 || 13–4
|- bgcolor="ccffcc"
| April 12 || Virginia Tech || #11 || Alex Rodriguez Park • Coral Gables, FL || W 9–1 || Sosa (5–3) || McGarity (3–4) || None || 2,625 || 28–9 || 14–4
|- bgcolor="ccffcc"
| April 15 || #15 UCF || #6 || Alex Rodriguez Park • Coral Gables, FL || W 4–2 || Mediavilla (2–1) || Hukari (4–2) || B. Garcia (8) || 2,184 || 29–9 ||
|- bgcolor="ffbbb"
| April 17 || at Virginia || #6 || Davenport Field • Charlottesville, VA || L 4–5 || Rosenberger (1–0) || Woodrey (4–2) || Sborz (10) || 3,589 || 29–10 || 14–5
|- bgcolor="ffbbb"
| April 18 || at Virginia || #6 || Davenport Field • Charlottesville, VA || L 2–5 || Doherty (2–1) || B. Garcia (4–2) || Sborz (11) || 4,228 || 29–11 || 14–6
|- bgcolor="ccffcc"
| April 19 || at Virginia || #6 || Davenport Field • Charlottesville, VA || W 8–6 || Abrams (1–0) || Waddel (2–4) || B. Garcia (9) || 3,747 || 30–11 || 15–6
|- bgcolor="ffbbb"
| April 24 || #8 Florida State || #6 || Alex Rodriguez Park • Coral Gables, FL || L 7–817 || Zizrow (1–0) || Beauprez (1–2) || None || 4,189 || 30–12 || 15–7
|- bgcolor="ffbbb"
| April 25 || #8 Florida State || #6 || Alex Rodriguez Park • Coral Gables, FL || L 5–15 || Compton (2–1) || Suarez (4–1) || None || 4,650 || 30–13 || 15–8
|- bgcolor="ccffcc"
| April 26 || #8 Florida State || #6 || Alex Rodriguez Park • Coral Gables, FL || W 12–0 || Sosa (6–3) || Carlton (3–3) || None || 3,289 || 31–13 || 16–8
|-

|- bgcolor="ccffcc"
| May 2 || at Pittsburgh || #10 || Charles L. Cost Field • Pittsburgh, PA || W 9–5 || Mediavilla (3–1) || Harris (3–3) || None ||  || 32–13 || 17–8
|- bgcolor="ccffcc"
| May 2 || at Pittsburgh || #10 || Charles L. Cost Field • Pittsburgh, PA || W 12–0 || Suarez (5–1) || Sandefur (1–6) || None || 502 || 33–13 || 18–8
|- bgcolor="ccffcc"
| May 3 || at Pittsburgh || #10 || Charles L. Cost Field • Pittsburgh, PA || W 9–3 || D. Garcia (6–1) || Berube (1–7) || None ||  || 34–13 || 19–8
|- bgcolor="ccffcc"
| May 6 || Bethune-Cookman || #8 || Alex Rodriguez Park • Coral Gables, FL || W 14–0 || Beauprez (2–2) || Austin (3–3) || None || 2,067 || 35–13 ||
|- bgcolor="ccffcc"
| May 8 ||  || #8 || Alex Rodriguez Park • Coral Gables, FL || W 26–0 || Woodrey (5–2) || Diaz (2–4) || None || 2,359 || 36–19 ||
|- bgcolor="ccffcc"
| May 9 || NYIT || #8 || Alex Rodriguez Park • Coral Gables, FL || W 13–1 || Suarez (6–1) || Plotkin (3–2) || None || 2,326 || 37–13 ||
|- bgcolor="ccffcc"
| May 10 || NYIT || #8 || Alex Rodriguez Park • Coral Gables, FL || W 19–1 || Sosa (7–3) || Martinez (2–6) || None || 1,847 || 38–13 ||
|- bgcolor="ccffcc"
| May 12 || Florida Atlantic || #7 || Alex Rodriguez Park • Coral Gables, FL || W 14–6 || Beauprez (3–2) || McKay (3–1) || None || 2,014 || 39–13 ||
|- bgcolor="ccffcc"
| May 14 || Georgia Tech || #7 || Alex Rodriguez Park • Coral Gables, FL || W 3–0 || Woodrey (6–1) || King (4–4) || None || 2,174 || 40–13 || 20–8
|- bgcolor="ccffcc"
| May 15 || Georgia Tech || #7 || Alex Rodriguez Park • Coral Gables, FL || W 22–1 || Suarez (7–1) || Parr (5–4) || None || 2,499 || 41–13 || 21–8
|- bgcolor="ccffcc"
| May 16 || Georgia Tech || #7 || Alex Rodriguez Park • Coral Gables, FL || W 17–4 || Hammond (4–1) || Gold (7–3) || None || 2,544 || 42–13 || 22–8
|-

|-
! style=""|Post-Season
|- 

|- bgcolor="ccffcc"
| May 20 || #29 Virginia || #6 || Durham Bulls Athletic Park • Durham, NC || W 9–5 || B. Garcia (5–2) || Bettinger (4–4) || None || 2,774 || 43–13 || 1–0
|- bgcolor="ffbbb"
| May 22 || NC State || #6 || Durham Bulls Athletic Park • Durham, NC || L 4–512 || DeJuneas (3–3) || Mediavilla (3–2) || None || 6,806 || 43–14 || 1–1
|- bgcolor="ccffcc"
| May 23 || #20 Notre Dame || #6 || Durham Bulls Athletic Park • Durham, NC || W 6–5 || Hammond (5–1) || Bass (3–1) || None || 4,249 || 44–14 || 2–1
|-

|- bgcolor="ccffcc"
| May 29 || (4)  || #6 || Alex Rodriguez Park • Coral Gables, FL || W 6–2 || Suarez (8–1) || Nunez (6–6) || None || 4,817 || 45–14 || 1–0
|- bgcolor="ccffcc"
| May 30 || (3)  || #6 || Alex Rodriguez Park • Coral Gables, FL || W 8–3 || Woodrey (7–2) || Roy (6–4) || None || 3,315 || 46–14 || 2–0
|- bgcolor="ffbbb"
| May 31 || (3) Columbia || #6 || Alex Rodriguez Park • Coral Gables, FL || L 0–3 || Barr (3–0) || Sosa (7–4) || Cline (4) || 2,759 || 46–15 || 2–1
|- bgcolor="ccffcc"
| June 1 || (3) Columbia || #6 || Alex Rodriguez Park • Coral Gables, FL || W 21–3 || D. Garcia (7–1) || Weisman (4–2) || None || 3,115 || 47–15 || 3–1
|-

|- bgcolor="ccffcc"
| June 5 || #15 VCU || #5 || Alex Rodriguez Park • Coral Gables, FL || W 3–2 || Suarez (9–1) || Howie (8–7) || B. Garcia (10) || 2,853 || 48–15 || 4–1
|- bgcolor="ccffcc"
| June 6 || #15 VCU || #5 || Alex Rodriguez Park • Coral Gables, FL || W''' 10–3 || Abrams (2–0) || Dwyer (10–3) || None || 3,680 || 49–15 || 5–1
|-

|- bgcolor="ffbbb"
| June 13 || vs. (4) Florida || #5 || TD Ameritrade Park • Omaha, NE || L 3–15  ||  ||  ||  || 49–16 ||  || 
|- bgcolor="ccffcc"
| June 15 || vs. Arkansas || #5 || TD Ameritrade Park • Omaha, NE || W 4–3  ||  ||  ||  || 50–16 ||  || 
|- bgcolor="ffbbb"
| June 17 || vs. (4) Florida || #5 || TD Ameritrade Park • Omaha, NE || L''' 2–10  ||  ||  ||  || 50–17 ||  || 
|-

|-
| style="font-size:88%" | All rankings from Collegiate Baseball.

Rankings

Awards and honors
Zack Collins
 Louisville Slugger Pre-season First Team All-American
 Perfect Game USA Pre-season First Team All-American
 Baseball America Pre-season First Team All-American

Andrew Suarez
 Louisville Slugger Pre-season Second Team All-American

Bryan Garcia
 Louisville Slugger Pre-season Second Team All-American
 Perfect Game USA Pre-season Third Team All-American

David Thompson
 Baseball America Pre-season Second Team All-American

References

Miami Hurricanes
Miami Hurricanes baseball seasons
Miami
College World Series seasons
Miami